Exaeretia praeustella is a moth of the family Depressariidae. It is found in Sweden, Finland, the Baltic region, Ukraine, Russia and Mongolia.

The wingspan is 16–19 mm. Adults have been recorded in June and August.

References

Moths described in 1917
Exaeretia
Moths of Europe
Moths of Asia